This is the 22nd edition of the tournament and first appearance for Burgan SC, while rules have changed that there are no more 2 legged matches all from 1 knockout match.

Al-Arabi SC are defending champions.

Preliminary round

Round 1

Round 2

Round 3

Round 4

Knockout stage
The knockout stages of the tournament is from 1 match only.
The top 6 teams of the league and the 2 winners of round 3 advance to the quarter-finals.

Teams:
 Al-Arabi SC
Current champions
2nd in League

Kuwait SC 
1st in League

Al-Jahra SC
3rd in League

Qadsia SC
4th in League

Al-Salmiya SC
5th in League

Kazma SC
6th in League 

Khaitan SC
Preminlary Round winner

Al-Sulaibikhat SC
Preminlary Round winner

Quarter-finals

Semi-finals

Final

See also
2015-16 in Kuwaiti football

Kuwait Crown Prince Cup
Kuwait Crown Prince Cup
Crown Prince Cup